{{Infobox election
| country = Norway
| type = parliamentary
| previous_election = 2013 Norwegian parliamentary election
| previous_year = 2013
| election_date = 11 September 2017
| previous_mps = List of members of the Parliament of Norway, 2013–2017
| next_mps = 
| elected_mps = List of members of the Parliament of Norway, 2017–2021
| title = Prime Minister
| posttitle = Prime Minister after election
| before_election = Erna Solberg
| before_party = Conservative Party (Norway)
| after_election = Erna Solberg
| after_party = Conservative Party (Norway)
| next_year = 2021
| seats_for_election = All 169 seats in the Storting85 seats are needed for a majority
| next_election = 
| image1 = 
| leader1 = Jonas Gahr Støre
| party1 = Labour Party (Norway)
| last_election1 = 55 seats, 30.84%
| seats1 = 49
| seat_change1 =  6
| popular_vote1 = 800,947
| percentage1 = 27.37%
| swing1 =  3.47%
| image2 = 
| leader2 = Erna Solberg
| party2 = Conservative Party (Norway)
| last_election2 = 48 seats, 26.81%
| seats2 = 45
| seat_change2 =  3
| popular_vote2 = 732,895
| percentage2 = 25.04%
| swing2 =  1.77%
| image3 = 
| leader3 = Siv Jensen
| party3 = Progress Party (Norway)
| last_election3 = 29 seats, 16.35%
| seats3 = 27
| seat_change3 =  2
| popular_vote3 = 444,681
| percentage3 = 15.19%
| swing3 =  1.16%

| image4 = 
| leader4 = Trygve Slagsvold Vedum
| leader_since4 = 
| party4 = Centre Party (Norway)
| last_election4 = 10 seats, 5.48%
| seats4 = 19
| seat_change4 =  9
| popular_vote4 = 302,017
| percentage4 = 10.32%
| swing4 =  4.84%

| image5 = 
| leader5 = Audun Lysbakken
| leader_since5 = 
| party5 = Socialist Left Party (Norway)
| last_election5 = 7 seats, 4.1%
| seats5 = 11
| seat_change5 =  4
| popular_vote5 = 176,222
| percentage5 = 6.02%
| swing5 =  1.93%

| image6 = 
| leader6 = Trine Skei Grande
| leader_since6 = 
| party6 = Liberal Party (Norway)
| last_election6 = 9 seats, 5.23%
| seats6 = 8
| seat_change6 =  1
| popular_vote6 = 127,910
| percentage6 = 4.37%
| swing6 =  0.86%

| image7 = 
| leader7 = Knut Arild Hareide
| party7 = Christian Democratic Party (Norway)
| last_election7 = 10 seats, 5.59%
| seats7 = 8
| seat_change7 =  2
| popular_vote7 = 122,797
| percentage7 = 4.20%
| swing7 =  1.39%

| image8 = 
| leader8 = Rasmus HanssonUne Aina Bastholm
| leader_since8 = 
| party8 = Green Party (Norway)
| last_election8 = 1 seat, 2.79%
| seats8 = 1
| seat_change8 = 
| popular_vote8 = 94,788
| percentage8 = 3.24%
| swing8 =  0.45%

| image9 = 
| leader9 = Bjørnar Moxnes
| leader_since9 = 
| party9 = Red Party (Norway)
| last_election9 = 0 seats, 1.08%
| seats9 = 1
| seat_change9 =  1
| popular_vote9 = 70,522
| percentage9 = 2.41%
| swing9 =  1.33%

| map = 
}}Parliamentary elections were held in Norway on 11 September 2017 to elect all 169 members of the unicameral Norwegian Parliament, the Storting. The non-socialist parties retained a reduced majority of 88 seats, allowing Prime Minister Erna Solberg's Conservative-Progress coalition to remain in government. The Liberal Party joined the coalition in January 2018 but it remained a minority cabinet until the Christian Democratic Party joined the coalition in 2019. The three largest centre-left parties won 79 seats. The Green Party retained its single seat, while the Red Party won its first ever seat.

Previous election
The last parliamentary elections in Norway were held on 9 September 2013. The outcome was a victory for the Conservatives and their populist right-wing allies. The Conservative Party, led by Erna Solberg, and the right-wing populist Progress Party formed a two-party minority government, with Solberg as Prime Minister. The two parties received confidence and supply from two centrist parties, the Liberals and the Christian Democrats.

Electoral system
The election used party-list proportional representation in nineteen multi-member constituencies, one for each of the counties of Norway.

The number of members to be returned from each constituency varies between 4 and 19. To determine the apportionment of the 169 seats amongst the 19 counties, a two-tier formula is used, based on population and geographic size. Each inhabitant counts one point, while each square kilometer counts 1.8 points.

150 of the seats are regular district seats. These are awarded based on the election results in each county, and are unaffected by results in other counties. Nineteen of the seats (one for each county) are leveling seats, awarded to parties who win fewer seats than their share of the national popular vote otherwise entitles them to. A modification of the Sainte-Lague method, where the first quotient for each party is calculated using a divisor of 1.4 instead of 1, is used to allocate both the constituency and leveling seats. A party must win 4% of the popular vote in order to win compensation seats, but may still win district seats even if it fails to reach this threshold. The system for apportioning seats is biased in favour of rural areas since the area of the county is a factor, but the system of compensation seats reduces the effect this has on final party strength.

Date
According to the Norwegian constitution, parliamentary elections must be held every four years. The Norwegian parliament may not be dissolved before such a four-year term has ended, a rather rare trait of a political system found in few, if any democracies besides Norway and the USA.

On 22 April 2016, the Norwegian government announced that the date of the election is set to be Monday, 11 September 2017. Additionally, each municipal council may vote to extend voting by one day, by also opening the polling stations on Sunday, 10 September.

Participating parties
Eight political parties were represented in the Norwegian parliament prior to the election, all of whom went on to contest the 2017 election.
The Labour Party (Ap) is with its 55 seats in parliament the largest party of the 2013-2017 parliament. Labour describes itself as a social-democratic party of the centre-left. The party is led by former minister of foreign affairs Jonas Gahr Støre, who has served as party leader and leader of the opposition since June 2014.
The Conservative Party (H) is the largest party of the incumbent government. Currently, the Conservatives hold 48 seats, after having garnered close to 27 percent of the vote in the previous election. The Conservatives' party leader is Prime Minister Erna Solberg. The Conservative Party is considered to be a moderate centre-right party in the Norwegian political spectrum, and it officially subscribes to the liberal conservative ideology.
The Progress Party (FrP) is led by Siv Jensen and currently serves as the junior partner in the Solberg cabinet. The party identifies as classical liberal and conservative-liberal. Political scientists broadly consider it a right-wing populist party, a label the party denies.
The Christian Democratic Party (KrF) is a centre to centre-right party, based on Christian democratic values. The party is led by Knut Arild Hareide, and participated in the 2013 election as a proponent of the centre-right coalition led by the Conservatives.
The Centre Party (Sp) is the fifth largest party in the Norwegian legislature, with 10 seats. Between 2005 and 2013 the party served as a junior partner in the Red-Green government. The party is led by Trygve Slagsvold Vedum. The party is centrist and primarily agrarian, with some conservative and some liberal factions.
The Liberal Party (V) of Trine Skei Grande currently holds 9 seats in the Norwegian parliament. It claims to be the sole social-liberal party in the country, and positions itself in the centre of Norwegian politics. The Liberals have a close relationship with the Christian Democrats.
The Socialist Left Party (SV) is the second smallest party in parliament, and campaigned for a third term as a part of the Red-Green coalition government in 2013. The party sees itself as democratic socialist and environmentalist. Since 2012, Audun Lysbakken has chaired the party.
The Green Party (MDG) made its debut in the Norwegian parliament in the 2013 election, gaining a single seat from the Oslo district. The Greens have no official party leader, but rather two national spokespersons. Currently, these spokespersons are Une Aina Bastholm and Rasmus Hansson. The party distances itself from the left-right axis, and identifies as an environmentalist party.

Additionally, the far-left Red Party''' led by Bjørnar Moxnes secured its first seat via a direct mandate in Oslo district. It had failed to secure representation in previous elections. The party is officially Communist in orientation and is a successor to the Red Electoral Alliance, which had previously won a seat in the 1993 election.

Opinion polling

Seat predictions

Results

Results by municipality

Government formation and aftermath
Prime Minister Solberg set out to form a governing coalition between the Conservative Party, Progress Party, Liberal Party, and the Christian Democrats. In late September 2017, the Christian Democrats left coalition talks due to the inclusion of the Progress Party.

On 14 January 2018, a government was formed by the Conservative Party, the Progress Party and the Liberal Party.

The Christian Democrats voted at a party conference to join Solberg's government on 2 November 2018 and on 16 January 2019, Solberg's Conservatives struck a deal with the Christian Democratic Party.  This marked the first time since 1985 that Norway would be getting a majority government representing right-wing parties in the Storting.

On 20 January 2020, the Progress Party decided to withdraw from the government due to a decision by Solberg to repatriate a woman linked to Islamic State and her children back to Norway.  Solberg said that she would continue to head a minority government and the other parties in the coalition (Liberal Party, Christian Democrats) said they would also continue to serve in it.

See also 
 2017 Norwegian Sámi parliamentary election

References

Further reading

 
 Bernt Arndal and Johannes Bergh. 2018. "The 2017 Norwegian election." West European Politics
 

Norway
Parliamentary
General
2010s elections in Norway
Norway